Events in the year 1841 in Norway.

Incumbents
Monarch: Charles III John

Events
 27 February – Frederik Due succeeds Severin Løvenskiold as prime minister, when Løvenskiold is appointed Governor-general of Norway.

Arts and literature

Births
29 July – Gerhard Armauer Hansen, physician (d.1912)
10 September – Thore Torkildsen Foss, politician (d.1913)
1 October – Sophus Christian Munk Aars, civil servant and writer (d.1931)

Full date unknown
Lars Anton Nicolai Larsen-Naur, politician (d.1896)

Deaths

12 June – Hans Jørgen Reutz Synnestvedt, military officer and politician (b.1777)
21 October – Niels Hertzberg, priest and politician (b.1759).
21 November – Thomas Fasting, naval officer and government minister (b.1769)

Full date unknown
Osmund Andersen Lømsland, farmer and politician (b.1765)
Jens Schou Fabricius, politician (b.1758)

See also

References